Rovné is a village and municipality in the Rimavská Sobota District of the Banská Bystrica Region of southern Slovakia. It is located in the northern part of the district, about 14 km from Hnúšťa. A magnesite mine had been working in Rovné. In the village is post, foodstuff store and a football pitch.

References

External links
 
 
Photos from Rovné

Villages and municipalities in Rimavská Sobota District